Palace of the lions may refer to:

Palacio de los Leones or Cuarto de los Leones, one of the Nasrid palaces of the Alhambra, Spain, receiving its name from its main courtyard, the Court of the Lions
Palacio de los Leones, the main municipal building of the city of Rosario, Argentina, receiving its name from the two stone lions in front of its main portal
Casa Leoni (meaning "House of the Lions" or "Lions' Palace"), a palace in Santa Venera, Malta, receiving its name from the four stone lions on the roof
Singha Durbar (meaning "Lion's Palace"), a palace in Kathmandu, Nepal